Several euro mints exist in the eurozone. Not every eurozone member state has its own mint to produce euro coins.

Austria 

The Austrian Mint in Vienna produces Austrian euro coins.

Belgium 

The Royal Mint of Belgium produced Belgian euro coins until 2017. However, since 2018, Belgian euro coins have been produced by the Royal Dutch Mint in the Netherlands.

Croatia 

The Croatian Mint in Sveta Nedelja has produced Croatian euro coins since 18 July 2022.

Finland 

The Mint of Finland, with production facilities in Finland and Germany, mints Finnish euro coins. It has also minted euro coins for Cyprus, Estonia, Greece, Ireland, Luxembourg, and Slovenia.

France 

The Monnaie de Paris in Pessac is the exclusive producer of French euro coins. It also mints Monégasque euro coins and alternates with the Spanish Royal Mint for the production of Andorran euro coins. It has also minted Greek euro coins, Luxembourg euro coins, and Maltese euro coins.

Germany 

The two mints of the Staatliche Münzen Baden-Württemberg in Stuttgart and Karlsruhe have minted over 40% of the German euro coins in circulation. They also mint Latvian euro coins.

The Bavarian State Mint in Munich mints about 21% of circulating German euro coins.

The Staatliche Münze Berlin produces about one-fifth of German euro coinage.

The remaining portion of German euro coinage is minted at the Hamburgische Münze in Hamburg.

Greece 

The Greek Mint, a facility of the Bank of Greece, produces Greek euro coins. It has also minted Cypriot euro coins.

Ireland 

The Irish Mint (Currency Centre) in Sandyford, Dublin strikes the Irish euro coins.

Italy 

The Istituto Poligrafico e Zecca dello Stato in Rome mints Italian euro coins, Sammarinese euro coins, and Vatican euro coins.

Lithuania 

The Lithuanian Mint in Vilnius mints Lithuanian euro coins.

Netherlands 

The Royal Dutch Mint in Utrecht is the sole producer of Dutch euro coins. It also produces Belgian euro coins and has produced some Estonian euro coins, Luxembourg euro coins, Maltese euro coins, and Slovenian euro coins.

Portugal 

The Imprensa Nacional-Casa da Moeda in Lisbon mints Portuguese euro coins.

Slovakia 

The Kremnica Mint in Kremnica mints Slovak euro coins. It has also produced Slovenian euro coins.

Spain 

The Royal Mint in Madrid produces Spanish euro coins. It alternates with the Monnaie de Paris in France for the production of Andorran euro coins. It also minted some early Greek euro coins.

References

External links 

 National central banks and mints in the European Union (not all of them produce euros)

Euro coins